The Spirochaetales are an order of spirochete bacteria. Some species within this order are known to causes syphilis, Lyme disease, relapsing fever, and other illnesses.

References

Spirochaetes
Gram-negative bacteria
Bacteria orders